The Capitulary of Servais was the implementation of an agreement between Charles the Bald and his half-brother Lothar to maintain the peace. In a conference of Charles and Lothar at Valenciennes in 853, the missi [literally, the sent ones] were re-established after a long hiatus. Lothar recommended that peace and justice be secured by sending out missi to enforce the laws and help keep the peace. The Diet of Servais confirmed the decisions arrived at during the conference. The Capitulary of Servais was enacted by Charles in November 853 dividing the Franco-Burgundian portion of Charles’ realm into twelve districts (missatica) to enforce the measures of this agreement. According to Nelson, the twelve missicati and associated missi were:
 Missaticum 1: Rheims, Voncq, Perthes, Bar-le-Duc, Chanzy, Vertus, Binson, Tardenois
 Missi: Bishop Hincmar [of Rheims], Ricuin, Engilscale
 Missaticum 2: Laon, Porcien, Soissons, Orxois, Valnis
 Missi: Bishop Pardulus [of Laon], Altmar, Theodacrus
 Missaticum 3: Noyon, Vermandois, Arras, Courtrai, Flanders, the counties of Engelram and the counties of Waltcaud
 Missi: Bishop Immo [of Noyon], Abbot Adalard [of St-Bertin], Waltcaud, Oldaric
 Missaticum 4: The counties of Berengar, Engiscalc, Gerard and the counties of Reginar
 Missi: Bishop Folcuin [of Thérouanne], Adalgar, Engiscalc and Berengar
 Missaticum 5: Paris, Meaux, Senlis, Vexin, Beauvais, Vendcuil
 Missi: Abbot Louis [of St-Denis], Bishop Erminfridus [of Beauvais], Ingilwin, Gotselm
 Missaticum 6: Rouen, Talau, Vimeu, Poitnieu, Amiens
 Missi: Bishop Paul [of Rouen], Bishop Hilmerad [of Amiens], Herloin, Hungar
 Missaticum 7: Avranches, Countances, Bayeux, Cotentin, Otlinga Saxonia and Harduin’s [part of that area], Eu, Lisieux
 Missi: Bishop Airard [of Lisieux], Abbot Theuderic [of Jumiéges], Herloin, Harduin
 Missaticum 8: Le Mans, Angers, Tours, Corbonnais, Sées
 Missi: Bishop Dodo [of Angers], Robert and Osbert
 Missaticum 9: Blois, Orléans, Vendôme, Chartres, Dreux, Chateaudun, Evreux, Arpajon, Poissy, Mardie
 Missi: Bishop Bouchard [of Chartres], Rudulf, Abbot Henry
 Missaticum 10: Troyes, Gatinais, Melun, Provins, Arcis-sur-Aube, Brienne
 Missi: Bishop Wenilo [of Sens], Odo [brother of Robert the Strong] and Donatus
 Missaticum 11: Counties of Milo and counties of Isembard, namely Autun, Macon, Chalon, [land of] Chattuarii, Tonnerre, Beaune, Deusme, the county of Attela, and the county of Romold
 Missi: Bishop Theutbald [of Langres], Bishop Jonas [of Autun], Abbot Abbo, and Daddo
 Missicatum 12: Nevers, Auxerre, Avallon
 Missi: Hugh, Gozso (or Cozso), Nibelung.
See also Capitularies of Charles the Bald.

Sources 
Nelson, Janet Laughland, Charles the Bald, Longman Press, 1992
Thompson, James Westfall, The Decline of the Missi Dominici in Frankish Gaul, University of Chicage Press, 1903 

History of Europe